The Texarkana Urban Transit District (TUTD) is the primary provider of public transit and paratransit services in the Texarkana metropolitan area, established in October 2000. TUTD is governed by the nine-member Texarkana Urban Transit Board, whose members are representatives of city governments in Texarkana, Texas, Texarkana, Arkansas, Nash, Texas, and Wake Village, Texas. TUTD operates eight fixed-route bus routes — branded as T-LINE — on Monday through Saturday, excluding six designated holidays: New Year's Day, Memorial Day, Independence Day, Labor Day, Thanksgiving Day, and Christmas Day. The agency also operates in coordination with the Ark-Tex Council of Governments Rural Public Transit District (ATCOG RTD), which provides connecting services (branded as TRAX) to Cass, Delta, Franklin, Hopkins, Lamar, Morris, Red River and Titus counties in Texas, in addition TUTD's primary service area.

Routes
1 State Line Avenue
2 East 9th Street
3 Highway 71 South
4 S. Lake Drive
5 Nash/Wake Village
6 Richmond Road
7 County Avenue / Moores Lane
8 Jefferson Avenue / Arkansas Boulevard

References
T-Line website

Bus transportation in Texas
Bus transportation in Arkansas
Transit agencies in Arkansas